Ludovico Sarego (1558 – 5 August 1625) was a Roman Catholic prelate who served as Bishop of Adria (1612–1622) and Apostolic Nuncio to Switzerland (1613–1621).

Biography
Ludovico Sarego was born in Verona, Italy in 1558.
On 17 September 1612, he was appointed during the papacy of Pope Paul V as Bishop of Adria.
On 14 October 1612, he was consecrated bishop by Giovanni Garzia Mellini, Cardinal-Priest of Santi Quattro Coronati with Coriolani Garzadori, Bishop of Ossero, and Marco Cornaro (bishop), Bishop of Padua, serving as co-consecrators. 
On 15 September 1613, he was appointed during the papacy of Pope Paul V as Apostolic Nuncio to Switzerland.
on 15 April 1621, he resigned as Apostolic Nuncio to Switzerland. 
on 24 September 1622, he resigned as Bishop of Adria. 
He died on 5 August 1625.

Episcopal succession
While bishop, he was the principal co-consecrator of:
Bartolomeo Cartolario, Bishop of Chioggia (1613); 
Andreas Corbelli, Bishop of Canea (1613); 
Vincenzo Bucchi (Buschio), Bishop of Kotor (1622); 
Lazzaro Carafino, Bishop of Melfi e Rapolla (1622); 
Fulgenzio Gallucci, Titular Bishop of Thagaste (1623); 
Eitel Friedrich von Hohenzollern-Sigmaringen, Bishop of Osnabruck (1623); and 
Hyacinthus Arnolfini, Bishop of Milos (1625).

References

External links and additional sources
 (for Chronology of Bishops) 
 (for Chronology of Bishops) 

17th-century Roman Catholic bishops in the Republic of Venice
Bishops appointed by Pope Paul V
1558 births
1625 deaths
Apostolic Nuncios to Switzerland